Mobarakeh (also Romanized as Mobārakeh; also known as Mobārak and Mubārak) is a village in Pishkuh Rural District, in the Central District of Taft County, Yazd Province, Iran. At the 2006 census, its population was 57, in 20 families.

References 

Populated places in Taft County